

aq
Aqua Lube Plus
Aquacare
Aquacort
Aquamephyton
Aquaphyllin
Aquasol A
Aquatag
AquaTar
Aquatensen
Aquazide H

ar

ara-arf
ARA-C
Aralast
Aralen
Aramine
Aranesp (Amgen) 
aranidipine (INN)
aranotin (INN)
araprofen (INN)
arasertaconazole (INN)
Arava. Redirects to Leflunomide.
arbaclofen placarbil (USAN, INN)
arbaprostil (INN)
arbekacin (INN)
arbutamine (INN)
Arcalyst
Arcet
arcitumomab (INN)
arclofenin (INN)
ardacin avoparcin (INN)
ardenermin (USAN)
ardeparin sodium (INN)
Arduan
Aredia
Aredia (Novartis) 
Arestin
Arestocaine hcl
arfalasin (INN)
arfendazam (INN)
Arfonad

arg-ars
Argatroban
argatroban (INN)
Argesic-SA
argimesna (INN)
arginine (INN)
argipressin (INN)
argiprestocin (INN)
Argyrol S.S.
arhalofenate (USAN, INN)
Aricept
arildone (INN)
Arimidex (AstraZeneca) 
aripiprazole (INN)
Aristocort
Aristogel
Aristospan
Arixtra (GlaxoSmithKline)
Arlex
Arlidin
armodafinil (USAN)
Armour Thyroid
arnolol (INN)
arofylline (INN)
Aromasin (Pharmacia & Upjohn Company) 
aronixil (INN)
arotinolol (INN)
arprinocid (INN)
arpromidine (INN)
Arrestin (Inspira)
arsanilic acid (INN)
arsenic trioxide (USAN)
arsthinol (INN)

art
Artane. Redirects to Trihexyphenidyl.
arteflene (INN)
artemether (INN)
artemisinin (INN)
arterolane (INN)
artesunate (INN)
Artha-G
Arthropan
Arthrotec
articaine (INN)
artilide (INN)

arv
Arvestin (INN)

ary
AryoSeven (AryoGen)

arz
Arzerra (GlaxoSmithKline)